Monette A. Cummings (1914 – 1999) was an American writer of pulp fiction of various genres including regency romance and planetary romance.

She was born in Kansas City, Missouri. Her work was collected in Exile and Other Tales of Fantasy, published in 1968.

Her novel The Beauty’s Daughter was awarded a RITA Award for Best Regency Historical Romance in 1986.

Cummings died in Lawrence, Kansas in 1999.

References

External links
 M. A. Cummings, "No Pets Allowed"; an audio version of the story at Librivox.

1914 births
1999 deaths
American women novelists
Pulp fiction writers
Women romantic fiction writers
RITA Award winners
20th-century American women